Cathryn is a feminine given name. It is a variant of Katherine. Cathryn may refer to:

 Cathryn Bradshaw, (Born 1964), English actress
 Cathryn Carson, American historian of science
 Cathryn Damon (1930–1987), American actress
 Cathryn Hankla (born 1958), American poet and novelist
 Cathryn Harrison (born 1959), English actress
 Cathryn Humphris, American television writer
 Cathryn Mataga, game programmer who has worked on Neverwinter Nights
 Cathryn Fitzpatrick (born 1968), Australian cricketer
 Cathryn Michon,  actress and stand-up comic
 Cathryn Caroline Fayard

References

See also
 Katherine (given name)

nn:Katrine